Holzbach is a river of Rhineland-Palatinate, Germany. It is a left tributary of the Elbbach in Gemünden.

See also
List of rivers of Rhineland-Palatinate

References

Rivers of Rhineland-Palatinate
Rivers of the Westerwald
Rivers of Germany